The large-eye conger (Ariosoma marginatum) is an eel in the family Congridae (conger/garden eels). It was described by Léon Vaillant and Henri Émile Sauvage in 1875, originally under the genus Congrogadus. It is a tropical, marine eel which is known from the northwestern and eastern central Pacific Ocean, including Hawaii and the Ladd Seamount. It typically dwells at a depth range of 2–420 metres, and leads a benthic, nocturnal lifestyle, burrowing into sand. Males can reach a maximum total length of 38 centimetres.

References

Ariosoma
Taxa named by Léon Vaillant
Taxa named by Henri Émile Sauvage
Fish described in 1875